The Cobb River (also known as the Big Cobb River) and its tributary the Little Cobb River are small rivers in southern Minnesota in the United States.  The Cobb River is a  tributary of the Le Sueur River. Via the Le Sueur, Blue Earth and Minnesota rivers, it is part of the watershed of the Mississippi River.

Course
The Cobb River rises at the outlet of Freeborn Lake in northwestern Freeborn County and flows generally northwestwardly through northeastern Faribault, southwestern Waseca, and southwestern Blue Earth counties.

In Blue Earth County it collects the Little Cobb River, which rises in southwestern Waseca County and flows  generally westward.

Ziegler's Ford on the Cobb River is a 1904 example of the pin-connected Pratt through truss bridges once common in Minnesota, and one of the few built by a company based outside of Minneapolis–Saint Paul.  It was removed in 1995.

See also
List of rivers of Minnesota
List of longest streams of Minnesota

References

Rivers of Minnesota
Rivers of Blue Earth County, Minnesota
Rivers of Faribault County, Minnesota
Rivers of Freeborn County, Minnesota
Rivers of Waseca County, Minnesota
Tributaries of the Mississippi River
Le Sueur River